"Good Bait" is a jazz composition written by American jazz piano player and composer Tadd Dameron and by  band leader Count Basie. It was introduced in 1944 and was popular in the 1940s and 1950s.

Form
Good Bait uses the changes to "I've Got Rhythm" (Rhythm changes) transposed up by a fourth as its bridge.

The chord changes to Good Bait are similar to those of La Mer ("The Sea"), which was released at about the same time, and the title "Good Bait" may be an allusion to the sea.

Other recorded versions
The song has been performed by a number of other artists, including:
 Charlie Parker with Dizzy Gillespie and His Orchestra - Live "Pershing Ballroom", Chicago (1948)
 Fats Navarro with Tadd Dameron - Broadcast "Royal Roost", New York, August 29 and October 2, 1948 
 Miles Davis with Tadd Dameron - several live recordings, 1949 and 1951
 John Coltrane - Soultrane (1958)
 Nina Simone - Little Girl Blue (1958)
 Johnny Griffin - Johnny Griffin's Studio Jazz Party (1960)
 Albert Ayler - Something Different!!!!!! (The First Recordings Vols. 1 & 2) (1962)
 Dizzy Gillespie - Something Old, Something New (1963)
 Don Patterson - Brothers-4 (1969)
 Dexter Gordon - Lullaby for a Monster (1976)
 Duke Jordan - I Remember Bebop : Duke Jordan Plays Tadd Dameron (1977)
 Tommy Flanagan - Something Borrowed, Something Blue (1978)
 Roland Hanna - Bird Watching (1978)
 Max Roach - In the Light (1982)
 Bobby Hutcherson - Good Bait (1984)
 Warne Marsh - Back Home (1986)
 Mal Waldron and Jim Pepper - Art of the Duo (1988)
 Steve Grossman - In New York (1991)
 Joe Pass - Live at Yoshi's (1992)
 Robert Trowers - Synopsis (1992)
 Von Freeman - You Talkin' To Me?! (1999)
 Joe Lovano - On This Day ... Live at The Vanguard (2002)
 The James Moody and Hank Jones Quartet - Our Delight (2006)

See also
List of jazz contrafacts

References

1944 songs
1940s jazz standards
Songs with music by Tadd Dameron
Bebop jazz standards